Petraeovitex is a genus of eight climbing shrubs species known to science, of the mint family Lamiaceae (formerly placed within Verbenaceae).
Collectively, they grow naturally in Borneo, Peninsular Malaysia, Sumatra, the Philippines, the Moluccas, New Guinea, Bismarck Archipelago, the Solomon Islands and Cape York Peninsula, Australia.

Species
The 1981 review paper by Harold N. Moldenke was the source, additional distribution information came from the Australian Tropical Rainforest Plants information system:
 Petraeovitex bambusetorum  – Borneo
 Petraeovitex kinabaluensis  – Borneo
 Petraeovitex membranacea  – Borneo
 Petraeovitex multiflora  – Moluccas, New Guinea, Bismarck Arch., Solomon Is., Cape York Peninsula, Australia
 Petraeovitex scortechinii  – Borneo, Peninsular Malaysia
 Petraeovitex sumatrana  – Sumatra, Borneo
 Petraeovitex trifoliata  – Philippines, Borneo
 Petraeovitex wolfei  – Peninsular Malaysia

References

Lamiaceae
Lamiaceae genera
Taxa named by Daniel Oliver